Trimdon Grange is a village in County Durham, in England. It is situated ten miles to the west of Hartlepool, and a short distance to the north of Trimdon.

Colliery disaster
At 14:40 on 16 February 1882 the Trimdon Grange colliery suffered a major explosion causing the deaths of 69 men and boys.  The coroner (TW Snagge) reported to both houses of Parliament:
 The mine was a dusty mine and watering should have been daily but it was done "not in all places, but where it was absolutely necessary."
 The mine was not "more than ordinarily gassy", but there is some evidence that the identified points of leakage might have been points of accumulation from leaks elsewhere.
 The lamps in use were Davy pattern and naked lights called "midgies" in some areas.  The coroner found no evidence that the midgies were connected with the explosion.
 Good order and discipline prevailed in Trimdon Grange Colliery.
 The roof above the workings in the narrow pit district had been observed to be dangerous.
The inquest concluded:

The coroner further observed:

Not all the men were killed by the explosion and fire.  After the explosion the burnt methane (firedamp) forms carbon dioxide (then called carbonic acid gas) and carbon monoxide.  The resulting mixture is called afterdamp and will suffocate and kill.  Indeed, the gas forced its way through a passage into the adjoining Kelloe Pit where six men lost their lives from the afterdamp.

"Trimdon Grange Explosion" (1882 song)

The incident was recounted in the song "Trimdon Grange Explosion" by the local collier-bard Thomas "Tommy" Armstrong. Armstrong performed the song within a few days of the disaster in the local Mechanics' Hall.

The lyrics of the song include an accounting of the events that took place, such as:

The song also asks the local community to help out in the wake of the incident:

The song became known outside of Trimdon Grange and has been recorded by other artists, including Martin Carthy, The Mekons and Alan Price.

Trimdon Grange Wind Farm

There is a small (5.2 MW) wind farm near the village.  Controversy arose in 2004 when the agent of the then Prime Minister, Tony Blair, claimed the location was unsuitable.

Notable people
George Bradshaw, professional footballer
Albert Brallisford, professional footballer who played for several clubs including Trimdon Grange Colliery between 1930 and 1934.
Peter Lee (trade unionist), (1864–1935). Miner's leader, early Labour county councillor and Methodist local preacher, born in Trimdon Grange.

References and notes

External links
 National Archive lesson on life in Trimdon in the 19th century
 Trimdon Times a local on-line newspaper

 
Villages in County Durham
Coal mines in County Durham
1880 mining disasters
1880 in England
Coal mining disasters in England
1882 disasters in the United Kingdom
Explosions in 1882